Claude Ndam (27 May 1955 – 12 June 2020) was a Cameroonian singer-songwriter.

Biography
Ndam was born in Foumban in the west of the country. He became famous in the 1980s for his discography.

Claude Ndam died in Yaoundé at the age of 65 on 12 June 2020.

Discography
Oh Oh Oh
C'est toi que j'aime
Mona La Veve
U Nguo Ya

References

1955 births
2020 deaths
20th-century Cameroonian male singers